The Toronto Alexithymia Scale is a measure of deficiency in understanding, processing, or describing emotions. It was developed in 1986 and later revised, removing some of the items. The current version has twenty statements rated on a five-point Likert scale.

The reliability and validity of the TAS-20 was established by a series of articles by R. Michael Bagby et al.

It has been researched extensively.

See also
 Alexithymia

References 

Psychological tests and scales